Pesochnaya is a rural locality (a village) in Karinskoye Rural Settlement, Alexandrovsky District, Vladimir Oblast, Russia. The population was 3 as of 2010. There are 3 streets.

Geography 
Pesochnaya is located on the Molokcha River, 32 km southwest of Alexandrov (the district's administrative centre) by road. Perematkino is the nearest rural locality.

References 

Rural localities in Alexandrovsky District, Vladimir Oblast